The K2 Black Panther (Hangul: K2 '흑표'; Hanja: K2 '黑豹') is a South Korean main battle tank designed by the Agency for Defense Development and manufactured by Hyundai Rotem. The tank's design began in the 1990s to meet the strategic requirements of the Republic of Korea Army's reform for three-dimensional, high-speed maneuver warfare based on use of network-centric warfare.

Mass production commenced in 2013, and the first K2s were deployed with the South Korean armed forces in July 2014.

History

Development 
South Korea has been accumulating tank development and production technology to increase its self-reliance in producing arms. In 1976, South Korea upgraded its M48 Patton tanks. In 1987, the K1 88-Tank, designed by General Dynamics Land Systems (GDLS), was commissioned for service. South Korea participated in its development, and gained tank development capability. The K1 is basically an American-designed M1 Abrams derivative produced in South Korea, and its associated legal agreements will significantly limit South Korea's rights for export, logistics, and future enhancements.

In the early 1990s, Korean engineers suggested producing a new domestically designed tank using the latest available technology, but the military refused due to cost overruns on other domestic tanks produced. South Korea decided instead to upgrade the K1, and it received a technical data upgrade package which also limited the involvement of GDLS from further development. This thus increased K2's localization, and South Korea gained development experience while also taking the responsibility for failure. South Korea then went on to develop turret design technology, a fire-control system, sights, and composite armor. The operational prototype of the new variant K1A1 was later displayed in 1996, but the 1997 Asian financial crisis delayed its mass production. South Korea worked on further localization during the delay and managed to develop its own designs or produce most parts of the K1A1 under license.

While the K1A1 development was ongoing, South Korea began to plan a new domestic main battle tank as its tank design and manufacturing capability matured. There were three main reasons for the development of the new tank:

First of all, despite the increase in localization, K1A1 was still an American design that falls under the United States' export control to protect intellectual rights, which creates a burden when exporting.

Secondly, the M48A3K and the M48A5K operated by the South Korean military were older designs and needed to be replaced with newer, better designs.

Lastly, the Republic of Korea Army was adapting new tactics called three-dimensional high-speed maneuver warfare with network-centric warfare. When developers asked the Army what kind of performance the Army wanted to see with the new tank, the Army replied that network warfare capability for command and control is the top priority, not firepower, defense, or mobility. This new capability would need to be built into the new tank.

There was some opposition to the new tank development:  it seemed to many to be too early to adopt a new model, and there were also doubts because it would be the first tank ever designed domestically. However, the defense sector (the politicians, the military, and developers), consensus of the K1 tanks was they were something of a humiliation because South Korea wasn't responsible for its main tank. It was thus considered a matter of national pride to have the ability to design and build a leading main battle tank.

Developers claimed that during times of war, military logistics and support of armaments could stop when geopolitics came into play, as witnessed in the Middle East and Eastern Europe. There were also criticisms of many European nations as lacking investment in domestic warfare technology, and relying too much on weapons from partnerships (which have some other advantages, such as cost, but are not beneficial for national security). Historically, South Korea always maintained a policy of self-reliance on weapons, and so the new tank program was authorized.

From July 1995 to December 1997, system concept research was conducted including analysis of required operational capability (ROC), function, performance, operations, logistics, and the technology required. The first step was to develop a modeling and simulation system for theoretical study and analysis. Then South Korean developers invited experts from around world including Sven Berge re the (Stridsvagn 103), Philip Lett re the (M1 Abrams), Israel Tal re the (Merkava), Hayashi Iwao re the (Type 90), and Richard Ogorkiewicz for a 40 hour seminar to help guide the concepts of the new tank development. Per prior agreement, all the presentations were recorded, and used for guiding system development of the new tank. Then seven researchers of the Agency for Defense Development (ADD), who were responsible for designing the tank, were sent to the United Kingdom for a year of tank development education.

From November 1998 to December 2002, private companies joined the ADD during exploratory research, and developed core technologies and systems including the tank gun, the electric gun and turret drive system (EGTDS), and the gun autoloader. Other key systems and tests included automatic target detection & tracking (ATDTS), and cognitive identification ability of the combat control system along with its simulator, the semi-active in-arm suspension unit to dramatically increase mobility performance, and the proximity fuse (within 7 meters) for multi-purpose HEAT munition (to shoot down helicopters).

In 2002, Hilmi Özkök, the commander of Turkish Land Forces, visited the research center and witnessed the simulator capabilities and an actual model of the combat control system. Afterward, Turkey continuously sent its dignitaries to closely monitor progress, and it eventually led to cooperation in developing Turkey's Altay.

From January 2003 to 2007, a number of test vehicles were built:  two test vehicles, the MTR (Mobility Test Rig) and FTR (Firepower Test Rig), and three PV (Pilot Vehicles) were built to demonstrate technology and performance. MTR and FTR conducted mobility, fire control, combat control, and low temperature operating life tests, while PV1, PV2, and PV3 conducted tests for their endurance, operations, integrated logistics support, and their developer. The last prototype was unveiled on 2 March 2007 at the proving ground in Changwon, and the development was officially completed after being declared fit for combat by the Defense Acquisition Program Administration (DAPA) in September 2008. The XK2 development project, which began in 1995 and ended in 2008, cost a total of 452.6 billion won spread over 14 years.

Improvement 

In 2020, Samyang Comtech, which produces composite armors, began developing an improvement of front armors for K2 export versions, and later it changed to a modification and development project to completely improve the modular armor package for K2 export models organized by the Defense Agency for Technology and Quality (DTaQ) in 2021.

The third mass-produced K2, which began in 2022, included an improved Battlefield Management System (BMS) with the Korean Variable Message Format (KVMF), and the Korean Commander's Panoramic Sight (KCPS) and Korean Gunner's Primary Sight (KGPS) with improved resolution and automatic target tracking function.

Design

Weapon system and munitions 

The main gun and its munitions were developed simultaneously. In the early to mid 1990s, South Korea learned internal ballistics, external ballistics, and terminal ballistics for tank guns while license producing the KM256 tank gun, and invented self-sharpening tungsten penetrator for 120 mm APFSDS munitions during the K1A1 program. Using the acquired technology, engineers decided to increase firepower with longer gun barrels and enhanced propellants that were NATO compatible.

Compared to the 5.3 m long 44 caliber KM256, the new gun was 6.6 m in length and sent out projectiles at 12-13 MJ, which was a huge increase from 8-9 MJ. Since the projectile travels at hypersonic speed or at a muzzle velocity of 1,760 m/s (with K279), it was critical to develop heat resistance material and stabilization of the projectile. Early designs included an unmanned turret variant, which was scrapped in favor of a manned turret during initial exploratory development. Another plan was to equip Rheinmetall's experimental NPzK-140 140 mm smoothbore gun, but this plan was also scrapped due to issues regarding incomplete combustion of 140 mm munitions.

South Korea originally planned to receive technology transfer of chrome plating on tank guns from Switzerland, which only a handful of nations had such technology. However, the plan was changed to domestic development after hearing the refusal from Swiss firm. Engineers first tried chrome plating on the KM256 tank gun used by K1A1, then coincidentally found a classified method while reworking on defect-plated guns.

This is complemented by a home-grown bustle-type autoloader, similar to the Leclerc, which allows the tank to fire up to 10 rounds per minute. The laser barcode identifier of the autoloader recognizes the classification of pre-barcoded ammunition and selects a type of munition for loading based on mission need. The ammunition is loaded in a 16-shell magazine for ready-to-use, and 24 rounds at frontal hull, carrying a total of 40 rounds for its main armament.

The K2's primary anti-tank munitions, developed by the ADD and Poongsan Corporation, are the K279 APFSDS-T, designed with self-sharpening technology for armored targets, and the K280 HEAT-MP-T, a multipurpose chemical energy round with a proximity fuse that explodes within 7 meters from the target, for all types of targets including low-flying helicopters.

Secondary weapons include a 12.7 mm K6 Heavy Machine Gun  and a 7.62 mm M60E2-1 coaxial machine gun.

Korean Smart Top-Attack Munition (KSTAM) 
It is launched as a kinetic energy projectile, fired from the main gun in a high trajectory profile comparable to that of a mortar. Upon reaching its designated target area, a parachute deploys, giving on-board millimeter band radar, infrared and radiometer sensors time to seek and acquire stationary or moving targets.

When a target is acquired, an explosively formed penetrator (EFP) is fired from a top-down position, to exploit the weaker top armor of tanks. Target acquisition can also be directed manually by the tank crew via a remote link. These characteristics allow the launch vehicle to remain concealed behind cover while firing successive rounds towards the known location of an enemy, or provide indirect fire support against targets hidden behind obstacles and structures.

Fire-control system and optics 

The fire-control system (FCS) consists gunner's primary sight (GPS), commander's panoramic sight (CPS), ballistic calculator, electrical gun and turret drive system (EGTDS), and dynamic muzzle reference system (DMRS).

The K2 is equipped with an advanced fire-control system linked to an Extremely High Frequency (EHF) L-band Pulsed Doppler Radar system deployed on the frontal arc of the turret, along with a raman laser rangefinder and crosswind sensor. The system is capable of a "lock-on" mode, which can acquire and track specific targets up to a range of  using a thermographic camera. This allows the crew to fire accurately while moving as well as engage low-flying aircraft.

The fire-control system is also linked to an advanced gun stabilizer and trigger-delay mechanism to optimize accuracy while moving in uneven terrain. If the trigger on the main gun is pulled at the same time the tank encounters an irregularity in the terrain, oscillation of the gun barrel will cause temporary misalignment between a laser emitter at the top of the barrel and a vertical sensor unit (VSU) at the base. This will delay the fire-control system from activating until the beam is re-aligned, improving the chances of hitting the intended target.

The Korean Commander's Panoramic Sight (KCPS) and the Korean Gunner's Primary Sight (KGPS) are present in the Black Panther as in the original series of K1A1 tanks, albeit modified to utilize the more advanced sensors and armaments deployed on the K2. The K2's Korean Gunner's Primary Sight adopts a thermographic camera that is more advanced than K1A1, and the sight provides 4x and 15x magnifications using the optical system, and 30x and 60x magnifications using a digital image processor.

The tank gun and turret are powered by an EGTDS developed by Hyundai Rotem and Doosan Mottrol (now Mottrol). The EGTDS provides high efficiency and high precision drive control, and its performance is improved by 3-axis stabilization. It is also designed to minimize vibration and noise when the turret is driven. The turret achieved a rotating speed of 800 mil (45 degrees) per second at the prototype stage.

The commander of the tank has the ability to override the gunner's command, to take control of the turret and gun. Moreover, unconfirmed reports state that, in the event of an emergency, the vehicle can be operated by only two crew members, or even a single one. It is speculated that the fire-control system can automatically spot and track visible targets, compare them using the data link established with other friendly vehicles to prevent redundant target engagements, and fire its main gun without manual input.

Automatic Target Detection and Tracking System (ATDTS) 
K2 has an Automatic Target Detection and Tracking System (ATDTS) controlled by the Automatic Target Recognition (ATR) algorithm. When the target is identified as a foe by the IFF/SIF (Identification Friend or Foe/Selective Identification Feature) system, the tank automatically aims and performs laser distance measurements on the target even if the tank is maneuvering on irregular terrain while the target is moving. It can lead the target and fire automatically based on ballistic data calculated by the turret mounted laser rangefinder and crosswind sensor. This feature enhances the performance of inexperienced gunners significantly.

Network-centric warfare capabilities and operability

Network features 
The K2 houses the following features which help to improve situational awareness for the crew:
 C4I (Command, Control, Communications, Computers, and Intelligence) uplink.
 GPS/INS (Global Positioning Satellite/Inertial Navigation System) uplink.
 IFF/SIF (Identification Friend or Foe/Selective Identification Feature) system compliant with STANAG 4579. Located on the main gun mantlet, just above the gun, the system fires a 36 GHz beam in the direction of the gun for a response from the targeted vehicle. If a proper response signal is shown by the target, the fire control system automatically identifies it as a friendly. If the target fails to respond to the identification signal, it is then declared as a hostile.
 Battle Management System (Similar to the Inter-Vehicular Information System used in the United States military) allows the vehicle to share its data with friendly units, including other armored vehicles and helicopters.

Operability and maintenance features 
The following features are provided for crew operability and system maintenance:
 Network-based tank combat training system utilizing 3D virtual reality technology. The embedded training computer designed for the K2 allows driving, gunnery, single tank combat, platoon level combat and command and platoon leaders combat training, and allows real-time information sharing and training with friendly tanks through a network system.
 Built-in test (BIT) feature to verify the integrity of the tank system. The BIT system provides the convenience of checking the tank for defects in its main functions without any external test equipment.

Work is also under way to integrate the experimental autonomous vehicle, unmanned wheeled reconnaissance drone into the Black Panther's systems, giving the tank's crew the ability to scout without disclosing its location.

Defensive capabilities

Passive protection systems 

Despite South Korea producing K1 tanks, GDLS strictly prohibited Koreans from accessing to Special Armor Plate (SAP), which was identical to that of the M1 Abrams, in order to protect the United States' intellectual rights and national security. Armor for main battle tanks was commonly regarded as top secret and its technology was unlikely to be exported. Therefore, developing domestic armor was the only option in order to design a tank. The ADD and Samyang Comtech developed Korean Special Armor Plate (KSAP) for the K1A1 project, and South Korea also keeps most information in secret. In 1996, South Korea received 1,250 hp variant Russian domestic specification T-80Us along with Kontakt-5 explosive reactive armor (ERA), and studied its composite armor and ERA technology, which contributed to development of domestic armors.

The K2 uses modular armor system in order to replace inner material much quicker when its damaged or whenever enhanced version is available. Its armor was redesigned based on K1A1's KSAP, and is made of POSCO MIL-12560H armor steel, Samyang Comtech silicon carbide (SiC) ceramic plates, and aluminum (Al). The frontal armor has been claimed to be effective against the 120 mm APFSDS round fired from the L55 gun. ERA blocks are also present, with the addition of ultra-high hardness and high-hardness armor package and non-explosive reactive armor (NERA) planned for the K2 Product Improvement Program (PIP) and export variant model.

Inside the tank, a positive pressure and air conditioning system are installed to protect the tank crew from chemical weapon and biological weapon, an automatic fire suppression system is programmed to detect and put out any internal fires that may occur, and atmospheric sensors alert the crew if the tank enters a hazardous environment. In addition, the interior of the tank is installed with a neutron shielding liner made of polyethylene-boron moderator to protect the tank crew from neutron radiation from nuclear explosions.

Active protection systems 
The tank is equipped with Radar Warning Receiver (RWR) and Laser Warning Receiver (LWR), which detect homing radar or homing laser aimed at the tank and instantaneously turn the turret in the direction of threats as well as notifying friendly units via network system. The tank also has a total of 12 (6 on each side of the turret) Samyang Chemical K415 Visible/IR Screening Smoke Grenade. The K415 blocks visible and infrared view of the K2 from the enemy.

The K2 has a Multispectral Screening Smoke Grenade (MSSG) soft-kill active protection system. If a anti-tank guided missile (ATGM) is fired at the K2, the tank immediately warns crews and triangulate the projectile for activating SNT Dynamics SLS (Soft-kill Launcher System) that releases K419 multispectral screening smoke grenade, manufactured by Samyang Chemical, in the direction of the incoming missile at the most effective time. The multispectral screening smoke grenades hide tank from visible, forward-looking infrared, and millimeter wave optics and radar thus disrupt accuracy of missile.

The SLS is located at the rear center of the turret top, and is assisted by two Missile Warning Receiver (MWR) on the frontal turret using L-band pulsed doppler radar. Each system covers 90 degrees (total 180 degrees) and 60 degrees at a high angle, and is capable of detecting wire-guided missiles, which does not emit its own radar. The MWR will also be responsible for tracking and targeting incoming missiles for the hard-kill active protection system in future upgrades.

Mobility and maneuverability 

It can also climb 60% slopes (31 degrees) and vertical obstacles 1.3 meters in height. Due to the relatively compact design of the engine, the designers were able to fit an additional compact Auxiliary Power Unit (APU) into the remaining compartment space. This is capable of producing 8~10 kW, and intended to act as an auxiliary power unit with which the tank may power its on-board systems when its main engine is turned off. It will also allow the tank to conserve fuel when idling and minimize the vehicle's thermal and acoustic signatures.

The vehicle can cross rivers as deep as 4.1 meters using a snorkel system, which also serves as a conning tower for the tank commander. The system takes approximately 20–30 minutes to prepare. Furthermore, the tank can enter combat-ready status as soon as it resurfaces. It is said that K2's predecessor, K1, can cross a river of 2 meter depth after 2 hours of preparation, which also requires assistance from military engineers. However, a K2 tank does not require outside assistance for river crossing.

In-arm Suspension Unit (ISU) 

The Black Panther fields an advanced semi-active suspension system, called the in-arm suspension unit (ISU), which allows for individual control of every bogie on the tracks. This allows the K2 to "sit", "stand" and "kneel", as well as "lean" towards one side or a corner. "Sitting" gives the tank a lower profile and offers superior handling over roads. "Standing" gives the vehicle higher ground clearance for maneuverability over rough terrain.

"Kneeling" augments the angular range in which the tank's gun barrel can elevate and depress, allowing the vehicle to fire its main gun downhill as well as engage low-flying aircraft more effectively. The suspension unit also cushions the chassis from vibrations when travelling over uneven terrain, as the bogies can be adjusted individually on-the-fly.

The K2 also has advanced track system called Dynamic Track Tension System (DTTS). Maintaining optimum tension through all maneuvers, it dramatically reduces the chance of throwing a track even in the most extreme situations. The DTTS is also designed to maintain optimal track tension while K2 is maneuvering to minimize the excessive load on the track and prevent the track from peeling off the road wheels.

Engines and powertrains 
In March 2011, South Korean Defense Acquisition Program Administration (DAPA) announced that mass production of the K2, which the Army was expecting to deploy in 2012, would not happen due to problems concerning its engine and transmission. In the evaluation test conducted in March 2012, it was reported that the domestic powerpack did not meet the required operational capability (ROC) proposed by the Ministry of National Defense in three categories: cooling fan speed control, maximum power at low temperature, and acceleration performance.

In April 2012, DAPA announced that due to ongoing issues with the reliability and durability of the domestically produced powerpack, the first 100 production K2s would use German-made Euro Powerpack and that service entry would be delayed until March 2014. The first 15 K2 Black Panther tanks were put into service in June 2014. Faulty domestic engines and transmissions previously halted production, but the lowering of required acceleration performance allowed it to enter service. Until domestic Doosan Infracore (now Hyundai Doosan Infracore) 1,500 hp engines were produced, the first mass production was employed with a German-made MTU powerpack, which was able to produce 100 vehicles by 2015.

Hyundai Rotem signed a contract from the second batch of 106 K2 tanks in December 2014, but the vehicles continued to have powerpack issues due to the domestic SNT Dynamics transmission failing durability tests. After SNT Dynamics complained about the domestic powerpack test standards, the 107th Defense Acquisition Program Promotion Committee held on November 29, 2017, gave it an opportunity to retest the durability of the transmission, but SNT Dynamics refused to retest the durability of the transmission. In February 2018, DAPA announced the second batch would have a "hybrid" powerpack consisting of the locally developed engine with the German RENK transmission system, allowing them to start entering service in 2019. An additional contract for the production of a third batch of about 110 K2s is to follow within the next several years.

On 25 November 2020, the 131st Defense Acquisition Program Promotion Committee decided to produce tanks in a powerpack that combines domestic engines and German transmissions in the third batch because SNT Dynamics refused to retest the durability of the domestic transmission.

On 6 December 2021, a senior SNT Dynamics official said it solved a technical problem with the transmission defect, and only the Ministry of National Defense's durability test remains in the first half of next year, and the fourth production of the K2 tank will include domestic transmission.

K2 product improvement program (K2 PIP) 
The K2 PIP is an improved version of the initial production model of the K2. Improvements will include:
 Upgraded armor package made of ultra-high hardness and high-hardness armor steel combining nanotechnology, developed for the K2 export variant.
 Upgrading the semi-active in-arm suspension unit to an active in-arm suspension unit.
 Integration of a high-resolution terrain-scanning system to the vehicle's suspension system. This is purported to allow the vehicle to "plan ahead" by scanning nearby terrain up to 50 meters away in all directions and calculate the optimal position of the bogies in order to improve vehicle handling over uneven terrain.
 Integration of a hard-kill active protection system.
 Addition of non-explosive reactive armor.
 Potentially replacing the 120 mm / L55 gun with an electrothermal-chemical gun, which will significantly increase the vehicle's firepower and potential payload. Later, the plan was scrapped because ADD succeeded in developing a new desensitized propellant for 120 mm munition.

Korean Active Protection System (KAPS) 
The Korean Active Protection System (KAPS) is an indigenously developed hard-kill active protection system designed to protect the K2 from anti-tank threats. It uses a three-dimensional detection and tracking radar and a thermal imager to detect incoming threats. Warheads can be detected out to 150 meters from the tank, and a defensive rocket is fired to destroy them at 10–15 meters away.

The system can neutralize rocket-propelled grenades and anti-tank guided missiles. It may be installed on other platforms in the future like warships, helicopters, and buildings. Unit price per system is ₩670 million ($600,000). Implementation of the KAPS was cancelled in 2014 due to budgetary issues along with the price of a K2 being at 8 billion won, with addition of the KAPS it would increase procurement costs by 1 billion won per unit.

Production

Export

Turkey

After competing against the Leclerc and Leopard 2, the K2 established its first export customer in Turkey. In June 2007, South Korea and Turkey successfully negotiated an arms deal contract worth ₩500 billion (approximately $540 million) licensing the K2's tank design as well as exporting 40 (+15) KT-1 trainer planes to Turkey. On 29 July 2008, a year after the first negotiations between the South Korean and Turkish governments ended, Hyundai Rotem and Otokar signed a design assistance and technology transfer contract for the Altay tank development project. The contract included design assistance and technology transfer regarding the systems, 120 mm tank guns and armor packages required for tank development.

South Korean companies involved in the Altay tank development project transferred main parts production technologies and licenses to Otokar, a main designer of Altay, as well as tank gun subcontractor Mechanical and Chemical Industry Corporation (MKE) and armor package subcontractor Roketsan from January 2009 to 2014. Hyundai Rotem provided design assistance and technology transfer to Otokar to develop Altay tank systems, Hyundai WIA transferred tank gun production technology to MKE, and Samyang Comtech transferred Configuration design technology for armor plate, Material Processing Technology and Manufacturing & Maintenance Technology to Roketsan. In October 2014, it was reported that less than 50% of Altay's technologies were being developed based on K2's technology, and this percentage increased to 60% after Altay PV (Pilot Vehicle) was developed.

ADD and South Korean ammunition manufacturer Poongsan Corporation provided ballistics testing equipment and technical advice to Turkey's National Ballistic Protection Center (now Roketsan Ballistic Protection Center), which was established in October 2010, and conducted Altay's bulletproof performance test with Samyang Comtech. Later, with design assistance from ADD and Hyundai Rotem, the last prototype PV1 and PV2 were developed in July 2015, and the development project was officially completed in 2016.

On 10 March 2021, BMC, the main contractor responsible for the production of Altay tanks, decided to import engines and transmissions from South Korea to resolve the problem of production delays. On 22 October 2021, seven months after BMC decided to import Korean powerpacks, South Korea's DAPA approved the export of Hyundai Doosan Infracore DV27K engines and SNT Dynamics EST15K transmissions to Turkey. Since then, in August 2022, the durability test of the powerpack combined with the DV27K engine and EST15K transmission imported from South Korea is underway, and if the durability test succeeds, the first 250 Altay will be produced by integrating the Korean powerpack.

Poland

In January 2020 Poland announced negotiations with Hyundai Rotem for license production of the K2 Black Panther for the Polish Army.

On 13 June 2022 the Polish Ministry of Defence announced that it had signed a memorandum of understanding (MoU) to purchase at least 180 K2 tanks for the Polish military. The 180 tanks will be produced by Hyundai Rotem in South Korea starting in 2022 and then supplied to the Polish Army.

On 27 July 2022 the Polish Armaments Group (PGZ) and Hyundai Rotem signed a framework agreement to supply 180 K2s and 820 K2PLs. The contract includes rapid arms supply and extensive technology transfer from South Korea. 180 K2s will be produced in South Korea and delivered to Poland starting in 2022 and 820 K2PLs will be produced in Poland under license starting in 2026.

On 26 August 2022 the first executive agreement worth $3.37 billion was signed to procure 180 K2s in Morąg, northern Poland. The contract includes training programs, logistics packages, 120 mm and machine gun ammunition for the K2. Soldiers of the 16th Mechanised Division of the Polish Army were sent to South Korea in October 2022 to participate in the training program. The 180 K2 tanks, which will be delivered from 2022 to 2025, will be sequentially deployed to the 20th Mechanised Brigade, 15th Mechanised Brigade and 9th Armoured Cavalry Brigade, which are brigade-class units belonging to the 16th Mechanised Division.

On 7 September 2022 PGZ and Hyundai Rotem signed a partnership agreement to develop and produce tanks, armored vehicles and ground unmanned systems. The contract includes joint cooperation in building production facilities in Poland for the production and maintenance of 1000 K2s and developing next-generation ground combat vehicles, including the K3. In addition, the production facility to be built in Poland will be used as a hub in Europe for the sale and maintenance of Hyundai Rotem's tanks and armored vehicles.

On 5 December 2022 the first 10 K2s arrived at the port of Gdynia in Poland onboard the BBC Pearl and were delivered to the 20th Mechanised Brigade of the 16th Mechanised Division on 9 December 2022.

Prototypes and variants

Prototype 
 XK2 MTR (Mobility Test Rig): Experimental model for mobility tests, with main gun and electronic equipment removed from the turret. Only one was produced.
 XK2 FTR (Firepower Test Rig): Experimental model for fire control, combat control, and low temperature operation tests. Like the MTR model, only one was produced.
 XK2 PV (Pilot Vehicle): Experimental model for the technical demonstration test of three XK2s, these vehicles were also called Pilot Vehicles and numbered PV1 through PV3. The main test objectives of these models were endurance tests, developer tests, operator tests, and integrated logistics support tests.
 XK2: As the last prototype model developed based on the XK2 PV released on 2 March 2007, the development was officially completed in September 2008 after the operational test of the Republic of Korea Army.

Variant 
 K2: Mass production variant with explosive reactive armor added to the sides of the turret and chassis. Deployed to the Republic of Korea Army starting 1 July 2014.
 K2 PIP (Product Improvement Program): Improved armor package with ultra-high hardness and high-hardness steel, upgrading of the semi-active in-arm suspension unit (ISU) to an active in-arm suspension unit, integration of a high-resolution terrain-scanning system to the vehicle's suspension system. This allows the vehicle to scan nearby terrain up to 50 meters away in all directions and calculate the optimal position of the enemy in order to improve vehicle handling over rough terrain. The improvement also might include hard-kill active protection system and non-explosive reactive armor.
 Altay: Export model based on the K2 Black Panther, developed by Otokar with design and technology assistance from Hyundai Rotem. It was redesigned based on K2's system, a 120 mm tank gun and composite armor packages, but with a longer hull length, a seventh pair of road wheels as well as additional armor of the turret and hull. Additionally, unlike the K2, the Hydropneumatic Suspension Unit (HSU) is applied, and there is a lack of extremely high frequency radar system for Radar Warning Receiver (RWR) on the front of the turret, as well as no  automatic feeding magazine system for autoloader mechanisms inside the turret. The first batch of 250 units will be produced with Korean powerpacks.
 K2PL: Proposed licensed version of K2 for the Polish Armed Forces as a replacement for their aging fleet of T-72 and PT-91 tanks currently in service. The K2PL retains most of the K2's features, such as the CN08 120 mm gun barrel, bustle type autoloader, pulse-doppler radar and In-arm suspension unit (ISU), but it differs from the original version, among others: longer hull length, addition of another, seventh pair of road wheels, ammunition storage isolated from the crew, additional armor of the turret and hull by adding detachable panels of layered armor, and in the case of the drive compartment, a mesh and bar armor, designed to protect against HEAT projectiles. Under the framework agreement between PGZ and Hyundai Rotem on the supply of K2 and K2PL, 820 K2PLs will be produced in Poland under license from 2026.
 K2M (Middle): Proposed licensed version of K2 for export to middle eastern countries. It has an upgraded armor package and 7 road wheels, but unlike the K2, it lacks a Laser Warning Receiver (LWR) on the front of the turret.
 K2NO: Proposed licensed version of K2 for the Norwegian Armed Forces as a replacement for their aging fleet of Leopard 2A4. It is armed with a Trophy hard-kill APS, composite add-on armor, a 12.7mm CROWS, and add-on explosive reactive armor. In addition, preheating devices, battery heating packs, and electric air blow systems have been added to prevent the engine from turning off in Norway's cryogenic environment. The first few tanks were to be shipped from South Korea while the rest were to be built locally. The K2NO was competing against the Leopard 2A7 in tank trials. On February 3, 2023, a decision was made to move forward with the 2A7. See failed bids.
 K2 ARV (Armored Recovery Vehicle): Armored recovery vehicle based on the chassis of the K2 with seven road wheels.
 K2 CEV (Combat Engineer Vehicle): Combat engineer vehicle based on the chassis of the K2 with seven road wheels.

Operators

Current operators 

 Polish Land Forces – on 27 July 2022, PGZ and Hyundai Rotem signed a framework agreement to supply 180 K2s and 820 K2PLs. According to the agreement, 180 K2s will be supplied from South Korea from 2022, and 820 K2PLs will be produced in Poland from 2026. A total of 1000 tanks will be delivered to Polish Land Forces. On 26 August 2022 the executive agreement was signed to procure K2. A total of 180 K2s will be delivered to the 16th Mechanised Division from 2022 to 2025.
 16th Mechanised Division – a total of 180 K2s.
 9th Armoured Cavalry Brigade
 15th Mechanised Brigade
 20th Mechanised Brigade: 10 K2s

 Republic of Korea Army – 260+.
 8th Maneuver Division
 60th Mechanized Infantry Brigade
 11th Maneuver Division
 9th Mechanized Infantry Brigade
 13th Mechanized Infantry Brigade
 61st Mechanized Infantry Brigade

Potential operators 

 During EDEX 2021, the Egyptian Army and government announced negotiations with South Korea to co-produce the K2 Black Panther main battle tank.

Failed bids 

The Norwegian Army considered the K2 (assigned as the K2NO) in a 2020 bid against the Lepoard 2A7 and intended to make a decision in late 2022.  The government ultimately selected the Leopard 2A7, citing a close and established relationship with the German manufacturer as well as similar tanks being used by other European countries as deciding factors. The prime minister also erroneously cited Poland as a future Leopard 2 operator as part of the reason for the government's choice.

See also 

 List of main battle tanks by country
 List of main battle tanks by generation

Notes

References

External links 

 K2 Black Panther information
 GlobalSecurity.org
 EBS documentary video of K2 Black Panther
 Yonhap News article covering ADD, Doosan and S&T's development of K2's engine
 South Korean Defense Acquisition Program Administration Blog – K2 Explanation

Post–Cold War main battle tanks
Main battle tanks of South Korea
Tanks with autoloaders
Fourth-generation main battle tanks
Military vehicles introduced in the 2010s